Michael Ralph (born c. 1963) is an American actor and comedian. He is known for his recurring roles as Spencer Boyer on the sitcom A Different World, Tyrell Livingston on Cleghorne! and as Kelly on The Bernie Mac Show.

Career
Some of his other television credits include Martin, Moesha, The Parkers, All of Us, The Suite Life on Deck, Numb3rs, The Sinbad Show and Renegade.

He also appeared in the films Marked for Death (1990), Malcolm X (1992) and Nickelodeon television film Drake & Josh Go Hollywood (2006). Ralph has also provided his voice in numerous video games. He also provided additional voices for Happy Feet Two and Frozen II.

He is the younger brother of actress Sheryl Lee Ralph. He also starred in the TV series "The Bernie Mac Show" as "Kelly".

Filmography

Film

Television

Video games

References

External links

1963 births
Living people
Actors from Waterbury, Connecticut
African-American male actors
American actors of Jamaican descent
American male comedians
American male television actors
American male video game actors
American male voice actors
Date of birth missing (living people)
20th-century African-American people
21st-century African-American people
20th-century American comedians
21st-century American comedians
20th-century American male actors
21st-century American male actors